Emperor Gao may refer to:

Emperor Gaozu of Han (256–195 BC)
Cao Teng (died 150s), eunuch who received the title Emperor Gao of Wei posthumously
Fu Deng (343–394), emperor of Former Qin
Emperor Gao of Southern Qi (427–482)